The Welikada Prison (also known as the Magazine Prison) is a maximum security prison and the largest prison in Sri Lanka. It was built in 1841 by the British colonial government under Governor Cameron. It is overcrowded with about 1700 detainees exceeding the actual number that could be accommodated. The prison also has a gallows (unused since 1959) and its own hospital. The prison is administered by the Department of Prisons.

Following the attempted military coup in 1962, the arrested military and police officers were remanded pending trial in a special section at Welikada prison called the Magazine Section. To guard these officers, a special security detachment called the composite guard was selected from the Ceylon Light Infantry, with Major A Hulangamuwa in charge.

In November 2012, 27 people died in clashes between inmates and prison guards.

Core functions
Detention of prisoners on first conviction
Categorization of convicted prisoners on admission and transferring them to relevant prisons
Detention of condemned prisoners
Production of suspects to Kesbewa and Moratuwa courts
Provision of vocational training to prisoners
Launching of welfare and rehabilitation programs for prisoners

Relocation 
It is proposed to relocate the prison to Horana by 2024. The existing complex will be opened for investments.

Notable inmates
D S Senanayake - National hero, independence activist and first prime minister of Ceylon
F R Senanayake - National hero and independence activist
Captain Henry Pedris - National hero and martyr of the independence movement
Anagarika Dharmapala - National hero, independence activist and leading figure of the Buddhist revival
Colonel F. C. de Saram - A leader of the attempted military corp of 1962
Talduwe Somarama - The assassin of S. W. R. D. Bandaranaike, who was executed in 1962
Bombardier Gratien Fernando - Leader of the Cocos islands mutiny
Douglas Devananda - Tamil politician and cabinet minister
Sepala Ekanayake - Airline hijacker
Sarath Fonseka - Former Commander of the Army and Chief of Defence Staff who led the army for a win against the LTTE
Selvarajah Yogachandran - also known as Kuttimani was one of the leaders of former Tamil militant organization TELO, killed in Welikada prison massacre
Nadarajah Thangathurai - one of the leaders  of former Tamil militant organization TELO, killed in Welikada prison massacre

Scouting 
The world's first prison Scout Group registered by Imperial Scout Headquarters started at Welikada Prison in 1926.

See also
Welikada prison massacre

References

External links
Welikada Prison, Department of Prisons

1841 establishments in Ceylon
British colonial prisons in Sri Lanka
Government buildings in Colombo
Prisons in Sri Lanka
Residential buildings in Colombo
Scouting and Guiding in Sri Lanka